Reflections Records is a Dutch record label based in Arnhem and focused primarily on hardcore punk music. It started in 1994 as a fanzine that in 1998 added a 7-inch compilation to one issue that proved successful and sparked a shift to becoming a record label. At present, Reflections releases albums in a number of genres, including hardcore, indie rock and extreme metal. It also offers licensed releases for bands from outside of Europe.

Selected affiliated bands
 
108
The Automatic
Blacklisted
Circle
Daughters
Doomriders
Ensign
Face Tomorrow
Give Up the Ghost
Good Clean Fun
Kill Your Idols
Modern Life Is War
Psyopus
Ritual
Siren
Stretch Arm Strong
Sworn In
The Suicide File
Terror
The Deal
The Red Chord
Time In Malta

References

External links

Dutch record labels